Chuggington (also known as Chuggington: Tales from the Rails since series six) is a British computer-animated children's television series aimed at toddlers, produced by Ludorum PLC (Series 1–5) and Herschend Entertainment Studios (series six). It is broadcast on the BBC's CBeebies channel and other channels internationally. Originally composed of 5 series running from 2008 to 2015, the series left its five-six year hiatus when a new batch of episodes was released on Disney Junior in the United States on June 29, 2020, and on CBeebies in the United Kingdom on January 2, 2021. A seventh series is currently in production.

Setting
In the fictional town of Chuggington are young novice railway anthropomorphic locomotives, called "Trainees", Koko, Wilson, Brewster, Hoot, Toot and Piper. The trainees and sometimes the more experienced chuggers learn the value of loyal friendship, telling the truth, listening carefully, persisting under adversity, completing tasks, resolving conflict without violence, and similar values. The locomotives, called "Chuggers", are intelligent, empathetic, independent and somewhat self-directed. They have mobile facial and body features. Chuggers have no crews, yet some have crew doors that can open. Chuggers regularly interact with humans such as passengers and maintenance crews. Some chuggers are modeled after well known locomotives.

The town of Chuggington has a central area of large modern buildings. Side-by-side railway tunnels coloured red, blue, yellow and green run under the town centre, leading to the outside world. Countryside settings include a farm, a safari park, and a quarry. A 'Chugston Hotel' is mentioned. "Old Chuggington", an abandoned old town with a similar name to the titular town, overgrown with wild vegetation, is occasionally visited.

Episodes

Characters
Wilson, Brewster and Koko are the main characters in Chuggington.

Young trainees

Main
 Wilson (voiced by Morgan Overton in Series 1-3, Edward Sharpe in Series 4–5, Teddy West in Series 6 in the UK, Tony Terraciano in Series 1–5 and Jordan C. Reed in Series 6 in the US) is a red diesel-electric hybrid chugger whose enthusiasm is opposed by his short attention span, and most of his adventures as of Series 4 are in Chug Patrol. He is the main protagonist of the series. He is based on the EMD F-unit.
 Brewster (voiced by Charlie George in Series 1-3, Toby Davies in Series 4–5, Harry Reeve in Series 6 in the UK, Miles J Harvey in Series 1–5 and Jacks Dean in Series 6 in the US) is a strong, blue and yellow diesel-electric locomotive built to pull heavy loads. He is as of series 4 a member of the Chuggineers, the building team on Chuggington. He likes to haul heavy loads on pick-ups, and often picks up too much load. Other chuggers may rush when given a task, but Brewster asks questions if he is unsure. He is dependable, respectful and can be relied on when there is trouble. He is based on a British Rail Class 55.

 Koko (voiced by Imogen Bailey in Series 1–5, Alyssa Burton in Series 6 in the UK, Brigid Harrington in Series 1–5 and Madigan Kacmar in Series 6 in the US) is a green and white electric locomotive who was built for high speed, being one of the fastest chuggers in Chuggington. She loves to explore and have adventures, and to challenge her friends to a dare or a race. Although she can get into mischief, she always means well and knows when to apologise.

Non-Advanced
 Hoot (voiced by Tommy Romer Lee in Series 2–5 Beau Robertson in Series 6 in the UK, Ben Hudson in Series 2–5 and Ethan Cutillo in Series 6 in the US) and Toot (voiced by Mihira Philip in Series 2–5, Matilda Majilton in Series 6 in the UK, Tori Feinstein in Series 2–5 and Vivian Watson (Series 6) in the US)  are twins. They are nearly always seen joined back-to-back, but in at least two episodes by strong pulling they manage to separate. 
 Zephie (voiced by Jadie Rose Hobson in the UK in Series 1-4, Lola Shepleve starting from Series 6, and Isabella Palmieri in the US in  Series 1-4 and Lily Sanfelippo starting from Series 6) is a young direct drive system trolley car equipped with a scissor-lift trolley so she can life and rotate her cab which allows Eddie to work on things not normally accessible. She is particularly flighty and giggly.
 Piper (voiced by Eve Bentley in Series 3–5, Faith Delaney in Series 6 in the UK, Eve Bentley in Series 3–5 and Dakota Phillips in Series 6 in the US) is a small orange oil-fired steam cab forward locomotive. In her first episode, Old Puffer Pete says that she runs on vegetable oil. In another episode we find out that Piper can be mischievous. Though she means well, she is very inexperienced and won't often take time to think, but realises her mistakes and does well in the end.
 Tai (voiced by Mia Lakha in the UK and Angelica Hale in the US) is a purple trainee shunter from Zheng-Chu who works at the Docks. She reuses Calley's S1-S3 model.

Adult trains
 Hodge (voiced by Arthur Lee in Series 1-5, Lawrence Matthews in Series 6 in the UK, James Lukens in Series 1-5 and Gideon Modisett in Series 6 in the US) is a six-wheeled Dandy Diesel built from hodge-podge parts. He normally works with Eddie the Handyman and is a bit like a pickup truck. He is also often tasked with taking the rubbish to the recycling yard. With his "seen it all" attitude, it takes a lot to get Hodge excited.
 Old Puffer Pete (effectively known as Pete) (voiced by Paul Panting in the UK, Brian Greene from Series 1-5 and Mick Wingert starting from Series 6 in the US) is the elderly, oldest chugger in Chuggington and the annual Chugger Championship Race winner. He loves passing his wisdom on to the trainees or anyone who is willing to listen. He drives them mad with his endless stories (which often get him confused), and can never seem to remember the chuggers' names, but they are very fond of him. He works at the central distribution centres for Chuggington: The Drop Load and Freight Yard.
 Olwin (voiced by Jill Shilling in the UK, Margaret Robertson from Series 1-4 and Bernice Stegers in series 5 in the US) is an older female dark green British motherly steam locomotive who refers to the "trainees" as her "little chugg-a-chuggs". Olwin's coal is stored just forward of the cab, while her water is stored inside of her boiler, making her a tank locomotive. Olwin has not been seen since the episode "Fletch Shines".
 Harrison (voiced by Colin McFarlane) is a large blue American diesel locomotive who is often proud of himself and tends to show off, and is often admired by Wilson. He, along with Hanzo and Koko, is considered one of the fastest chuggers in Chuggington. Harrison has not been seen since the episode "Fletch Shines".

 Irving (voiced by Paul Panting in the UK and John Pohlhammer in the US) is a medium-sized dark red diesel engine who handles the rubbish and recycling chores around the depot; he is proud to boast that nothing is thrown away in Chuggington. Irving has not been seen since the episode "Chug Patrol Chief".
Dunbar (voiced by John Stocker) is a large green-coloured Scottish shunting locomotive who is largely responsible for the training of the Chuggers: Hoot, Toot, and Piper. He leaves Chuggington during Series 3, and is replaced by Skylar as the trainer. Dunbar has not been seen since the episode "Chug Patrol Chief".

 Calley (voiced by Nicole Davis in the UK and Phillipa Alexander in the US) is a small shunting locomotive who spends most of her time as a rescue chugger, but can also sometimes be seen shunting rolling stock. She was Dunbar's assistant from Series 1-3 until she joined Jackman in Series 4 and became a member of the rescue squad Chug Patrol, where she was repainted in Chug Patrol's signature colours. She loves rescuing more than anything and her catchphrase is "Breakdown chugger coming through-oooooooo!" Her old model was reused and modified for Tai, who first appeared in the show's sixth series. Calley has not been seen since the episode "Chug Patrol Chief".
 Emery (voiced by Jordan Clarke in the UK, Troy Doherty in Series 1-2, Hugh Reynolds in Series 3, Jake Tanner in Series 4-5, and Austin Connelly starting from Series 6 in the US) is a silver rapid transit locomotive often seen on elevated lines or in tunnels. He likes tricking and harassing other engines into thinking that they have a problem. He often carries an additional carriage or truck with him permanently, although in at least two episodes, he disconnects his carriage to go faster. He often announces his actions with transit announcements. He has heterochromia iridum.
 Chatsworth (voiced by Andy Nyman in the UK and John Chancer in the US) is an older well-spoken white diesel locomotive who generally performs the same tasks as Harrison. He can overreact easily, for example, he thinks that if his horn or coupler are broken that he cannot drive! He also loves his spotless white paint and hates getting dirty! Chatsworth has not been seen since the episode "Fletch Shines".
 Mtambo (voiced by David Gyasi) is a yellow, camouflage safari park ranger who works around the safari park, giving tours to visitors. He speaks with a Kenyan accent. His name means "engine" in Swahili.
 Frostini (speaking voice by Angelo Cola and singing voice provided by Randy Crenshaw) is an Italian ice cream train, popular with the children of Chuggington and seen by the trainees as very cool. He is normally seen handing out ice creams or at the factory working on a creation. He is quite proud of his accomplishments and speaks English with an Italian accent. In many episodes, he has the most emotions than any other chugger - mostly due to his stress at work at the Ice Cream Factory.
 Action Chugger (voiced by Pax Baldwin in the UK, John Pohlhammer from Series 1-4 and Dave Berry starting from Series 6 in the US) is a yellow and brown superhero chugger who responds to emergencies after being informed that he is needed by a flashing red light on his nose. He can unfold parts of his sides into short wings, each with a jet motor under it, and fly. After flying, he always lands on a railway track. Action Chugger's flight range extends at least as far as low Earth orbit. He normally resides in Chuggington.
 Speedy McAllister (generally named Speedy) (voiced by Warren Clarke in the UK and Stefan Ashton Frank in the US) is a large reddish-violet steam locomotive who is somewhat gruff and blunt in character but means well and is helpful to experienced chuggers and trainees alike. He prefers more industrial jobs as opposed to those with a high degree of customer relations. He mans the Rocky Ridge Quarry and Rocky Ridge Mine, along with the human: Karen. Speedy's whistle is the deepest of the four steam locomotives in Chuggington. Speedy's voice in the UK is a Yorkshire accent but in the US it is Western. Speedy has not been seen since the episode "Delivery Challenge".
 Skylar (voiced by Michael Quartney in the UK, Brendan Dooling in Series 3, Tony Denman in Series 4 and Jason Durran in Series 5 in the US) is a large yellow European crane locomotive who has just completed training. His crane ends in a two-fingered grab. He can use his crane and his side prop legs to flip himself end-for-end or onto an adjacent track. His model would be reused and repainted for Rosa, who appeared in the show's sixth series. Skylar has not been seen since the episode "Fletch Shines".
 Decka (voiced by Ninia Benjamin) is a double-decker tram built for heavy loads and passengers. She is brightly coloured and she has a big personality. She loves to incorporate her name into things, for example; "It was a deckalightful day!" Decka has not been seen since the episode "Chug Patrol Chief".
 Jackman (voiced by Michael Byers in Series 4 in the UK version and Michael G Stern starting from Series 6 in the US version) is the chief of Chug Patrol and the bravest chugger on the tracks. With a twinkle in his eye and strong leadership skills, Jackman makes the perfect leader for all four of the chug patrollers. Here is a saying: "If he uncouples now, he'll go flying."
 Asher (voiced by Marcel McCalla) is a red firefighting chugger from Tootington who is the newest member of the rescue squad Chug Patrol. Strong, brave, and reassuring, he takes care of the fires in Chuggington.
 Zack (voiced by Paul Dodds in the UK, Stuart Milligan in Series 4-5 and Mick Wingert in Series 6 in the US) is the chief of the Chuggineers. This foreman is organised, hardworking, and extremely safety conscious, making him the perfect leader of the Chuggineer crew. Joined by his fellow team members Tyne, Brewster, and Fletch, this engineering team is responsible for all the heavy lifting, loading, and building of bridges, tunnels, and stations, as well as laying track and making repairs.
 Tyne (voiced by Carina Reeves in the UK and Jessica McDonald in the US) is a female Chuggineer who loves to blow up unneeded buildings, she says that she is "proud to be loud". Tyne also shares a friendly rivalry with her peer, Fletch. Tyne has not been seen since the episode "Fletch Shines".
 Fletch (voiced by Joe Sims in the UK and Earl Perkins in the US) is a member of the Chuggineers who is strong, and likes playing small jokes on other chuggers. Fletch also shares a friendly rivalry with his peer, Tyne. Fletch has not been seen since the episode "Fletch Shines".
 Hanzo (voiced by Dai Tabuchi) is a white and blue bullet train who is the fastest chugger in Chuggington. Mentor to Koko, Hanzo is sleek, streamlined, and has a photographic memory. He believes there is no greater honour than transporting passengers quickly, but always safely, to their destination. Respectful, dedicated, and precise, Hanzo encourages fellow Speed Fleet chuggers to be the best they can through rigorous practice. He is always extremely punctual. He also has a calm peaceful tone when he speaks.
 Cormac (voiced by Jez Edwards in the UK, Walter Lewis in Series 4-5 and Tim Chase in Series 6 in the US) is a forklift chugger who works with Pete in the Drop Load and Freight yard, the central distribution site for Chuggington. Besides working in the Drop and Load yard, Cormac has many jobs around Chuggington. He loves driving around and having adventures! He sometimes assists the Chuggineers and Speedy.
 Payce (voiced by Ruth Zielinski in the UK and Siu-see Hung in the US) is a tunnel runner from Tootington, Chuggington's neighbouring town. Like the speed fleet, Payce is faster than the speed of light. She is good friends with Koko, yet shares a small friendly rivalry with her. Payce has not been seen since the episode "Delivery Challenge".
 Daley (voiced by Harry Lawtey in the UK and Nile Bullock in the US) is an express delivery chugger who reuses Payce's body. Daley has not been seen since the episode "Fletch Shines".
 Skipper Stu (voiced by James Goode) is a blue diesel who works is in charge of everything at Chuggington Harbour.
 Hamish (voiced by Richard Ridings) and Harry (voiced by Stephen Critchlow) are twin green and orange diesel haulers who work at the Chuggington Harbour. In Series 6, only Hamish appears. Harry has not been seen since the episode "Fletch Shines".
 Russ (voiced by James Naylor in the UK and Jos Slovick in the US) is a yellow rail-mounted reach stacker diesel working at the Chuggington Harbour. Russ has not been seen since the episode "Fletch Shines".
 Rosa (voiced by Tiana Camacho) is a turquoise Mexican/Spanish crane chugger from San Locomota. She is a member of the Chuggineers and reuses Skylar's model.

Ambiguous
 Vee (voiced by Maria Darling in Series 1-5, Jacqueline Davis in Series 6 in the UK, Johnnie Flori in Series 1-5 and Julie Wions in Series 6 in the US) is the depot announcer and dispatcher, with speakers all over Chuggington, in the depot and in remote areas. She keeps everything running on time and to schedule. After giving the chuggers their tasks, her dispatch board shows the destination, and shows which coloured tunnel to take when leaving the depot. She can be stern with disobedient chuggers. Vee has never been seen as anything other than her public address system.  She may be a human, or a self-intelligent system similar to the chuggers.

Humans
 Captain Charlie (voiced by Stephen Critchlow in the UK and John Chancer in the US) is the captain at Chuggington Harbour. Captain Charlie has not been seen since the episode "Fletch Shines".
 Dr. Gosling (voiced by Paul Painting in the UK and Mac McDonald in the US) is the safari park vet.
 Dr. Ling (voiced by Meg Kubota) is the resident scientist and researcher in Chuggington. She often develops various inventions for the chuggers to test out. Dr. Ling has not been seen since the episode "Koko Express".
 Eddie (voiced by Sacha Dhawan in the UK, Trevor White in Series 3-5 and Nick Hagelin in Series 6 in the US) is the depot handyman who turns his hand to all manner of tasks, including track maintenance and fixing signals and points. He currently lives in a caboose, similar in appearance to Morgan's house, close to Chuggington. He used to live with his parents some distance away, and was frequently late to work, but the trainees found an abandoned caboose and Morgan fixed it so Eddie could live in it.
 Felix (voiced by Andy Nyman in the UK and Elisha Sessions in the US) is the farmer in Chuggington.
 Howie (voiced by Steve Devereaux in the UK and Morgan Deare in the US) is the control person (like Vee) at the Working Wheels yard where chuggers (mainly Brewster, Koko & Wilson) get refueled/cleaned/get their jobs for the day.
 Karen (voiced by Maria Darling in the UK and Lorelei King in the US) is a lady who works at Rocky Ridge Quarry along with the steam engine: Speedy McAllister.
 Lori (voiced by Maria Darling in Series 1-4, Jacqueline Davis in Series 6 in the UK, Babara Barnes in Series 2-4 and Julie Phillips in Series 6 in the US) is Morgan's assistant at the Repair Shed, and was also tasked with cleaning engines before the arrival of the ChugWash. She is apprenticed to Morgan, and attends college.
 Mayor Pullman (voiced by Floella Benjamin in the UK, Lachele Carl in Series 1-5 and Carla Fisher in Series 6 in the US) is the female mayor of Chuggington.
 Morgan (voiced by Paul Painting in the UK, Taylor Clarke-Hill in Series 1-5 and William Stern in Series 6 in the US) is the Senior Mechanic at the depot, in charge of the Repair Shed. He lives in a house that looks like a caboose in Chuggington yard.
 Vicki (voiced by Nicole Davis in the UK and Laila Pyne in the US) is a safari park ranger, and looks after the animals.

Production
The creative core behind Chuggington is Sarah Ball, a producer and director who worked on Bob the Builder, and Don Toht, who designed the characters and sets.

The computer animation is made with Autodesk Maya software.

As well as the regular ten-minute episodes, there are four-minute shows, Chuggington: Badge Quest, focusing on the trainees' efforts to earn reward badges for their "Chugger" training.

Three Chuggington specials were commissioned for release on DVD from 2013 onwards.

On 10 December 2018, Herschend Entertainment Studios acquired the rights to the series.

Broadcast
The first series of 52 episodes was sold to broadcasters including the BBC, ABC (Australia), TF1 (France),Super RTL (Germany) and Fuji TV (Japan) in a deal announced in February 2008. A second series of 26 episodes was purchased by the BBC and many other broadcasters throughout the world. Aimed at children between the ages of 3 and 6, Chuggington made its UK debut as a "soft launch" on BBC Two on 22 September 2008.

Merchandise
In January 2009 it was announced that RC2 would be producing Chuggington toys under their Learning Curve brand; the toys were released to the market in 2010. RC2 contributed to half of the series' production budget in exchange for long-term global toy licensing rights.

Media
DVDs from Anchor Bay Entertainment include the first, entitled Chuggington: Let's Ride the Rails was released in March 2009 containing six episodes. A second DVD, Action Stations, released in October 2009, contained another six. The third DVD release, Wheels to the Rails, with another six episodes, is due out in late November. Anchor Bay's Chuggington: Let’s Ride the Rails was the first Chuggington DVD to be released nationwide in the United States on 8 February 2011.

In the UK, several children's books are in the works, including Koko on Call: A Nightlight Adventure, based on an early episode. Publications International and Scholastic introduced Chuggington books to the US market in late 2010 and early 2011, respectively.

Toys
In early 2010, the Chuggington Diecast Series of model trains was released in the UK. The Chuggington Diecast Series by Learning Curve was released in the US nationwide in late 2010. In 2012, the system was rebranded to StackTrack, in which children can stack the railway tracks on top of each other with supports. This system was discontinued by 2017, however the StackTrack track system is still in use.

Later in 2010, the interactive range was released in the UK. The chuggers and Vee, their dispatcher, can interact with each other using 'Smart Talk' technology and over 300 stored phrases. Each chugger can recognise the other chuggers, and their train stops. The interactive phrases spoken depend on which chuggers and locations are placed together, giving a more varied, but not random, conversation. The Chuggington Interactive Railway was released in the United States in February 2011. This system was discontinued by 2017.

The Chuggington Wooden Railway was released in September 2010 to Canada, and on 1 March 2011 to specialty retailers in the United States. It is compatible with all other wooden railway systems. This system was discontinued by 2017.

In late 2011, Mega Brands released the 'Chuggington Construction' range, but was now discontinued, as of 2013.

In the United States other Chuggington products include games (I Can Do That! Games), puzzles (Cardinal), and activity sets (Crayola).

In 2012, the Plarail Chuggington range was released and was discontinued around 2016.

In 2013 Bachmann Trains made a series of Chuggington electric train sets and separate sale engines and cars.  It is compatible with all other HO scale systems by other companies and is made to work with the Thomas & Friends range. In 2017, Bachmann Trains have discontinued the Chuggington range.

In 2019, Alpha Group Co., Ltd. acquired the rights for any future Chuggington vehicle toys.

Train and Tramway

According to Okayama Electric Tramway press report on 12 January 2018, it will be operated in 2 cars and 1 train with its own decorated appearance that reproduced Wilson and Brewster in Japan. With the all-seat reservation system, the operation start date is 16 March 2019. It is confirmed as the world's first in the railroad and tram related motif with this character as a motif.

See also
 Thomas & Friends
 Underground Ernie

References

External links
 
 

2000s British children's television series
2010s British children's television series
2020s British children's television series
2008 British television series debuts
British children's animated adventure television series
British children's animated comedy television series
British children's animated fantasy television series
British preschool education television series
British television series revived after cancellation
Animated preschool education television series
2000s preschool education television series
2010s preschool education television series
2020s preschool education television series
English-language television shows
Television series about rail transport
BBC children's television shows
CBeebies
Disney Junior original programming
Fuji TV original programming
Trains in fiction